Button Falls is a waterfall located on Button Creek southwest of Leonardsville, New York.

References

Waterfalls of New York (state)
Landforms of Madison County, New York
Tourist attractions in Madison County, New York